Sar Khong (also Romanized as Sar-e Khong, Sar-i-Khung, Sar Khank, and Sar Khonak; also known as Bāgh-e Sar Khonak) is a village in Qohestan Rural District, Qohestan District, Darmian County, South Khorasan Province, Iran. At the 2006 census, its population was 91, in 43 families.

References 

Populated places in Darmian County